Damascus Academy is/was a Quaker school in Damascus, Ohio. The school was founded in 1857 and was chartered under the laws of Ohio by the Friends' Church in 1885.

The psychologist Henry H. Goddard was principal from 1889 to 1891.

References 

Quaker schools in Ohio
Private schools in Ohio
Educational institutions established in 1857
1857 establishments in Ohio